Huracán Ramírez y la monjita negra (in English, "Huracán Ramírez and the Little Black Nun") is a 1973 Mexican lucha libre film written and directed by Joselito Rodríguez, and starring Pepe Romay, Titina Romay and Teresa Velázquez. The film is part of a series of films centered on the character of Mexican masked luchador Huracán Ramírez, which began with Huracán Ramírez (1952).

Plot
A mute orphan who lives in a convent establishes a friendship with a black novice (Titina Romay) newcomer to the convent, and helps her obtain the money necessary save the convent by moonlighning as the masked luchador Huracán Ramírez. Meanwhile, a rich woman (Teresa Velázquez), who uses the nun as an unwitting pawn to perpetrate her crimes as a con artist, tries to seduce him.

Cast
Pepe Romay as José
Titina Romay as Sor María de la Divina Concepción
Jean Safont as Sansón Pérez "el Elegante"
Queta Carrasco as Mother Superior Brígida
Juan Garza as René Ancira
Carmen Manzano as Sor Rita
Carlos Bravo y Fernández as Doctor (as Carlos Bravo Carlhillos)
Luis Del Río
Carlos Nieto as Said Slim
Roberto Meyer as Padre Bernabé
Carlos Rincón Gallardo as Hotel Clerk (as Carlos Rincon G.)
Ethel Medina
Martha Rangel (as Martita Rangel)
Guillermo García
Xavier Alcaraz
Teresa Velázquez as Deborah de Iturbide (as Tere Velázquez)
Antonio Padilla "Pícoro" as Ring Announcer (uncredited)

Wrestlers
El Nazi
El Matemático
Doctor Zee
Tony Salazar
Valentino
El Aguila
El Mosca
Sheik Mar Allah
Daniel García as Huracán Ramírez (uncredited)

Production
The film is part of a series of wrestling films centered around the fictitious Huracán Ramírez character, created by director Joselito Rodríguez and his son Juan Rodríguez Más, that began with Huracán Ramírez (1952). Although actor David Silva portrayed in previous films the role of Fernando Torres, the man who in-story dons the Huracán Ramírez mask, Silva does not appear in this film, and instead a new mute character is introduced donning the mask. Silva would likewise not appear in the next and final theatrical Huracán Ramírez film, De sangre chicana.

Reception
Several reviews of the film have considered it as the worst film of the Huracán Ramírez film series. In David Silva: un campeón de mil rostros by Rafael Aviña, Aviña describes the film series as "a series of films which would degenerate in an aberrant way in Huracán Ramírez y la monjita negra." The book ¡Quiero ver sangre!: Historia ilustrada del cine de luchadores speculated that the reason David Silva did not participate in this film and De sangre chicana (and the later direct-to-video film Huracán Ramírez vs. los terroristas) was "not because of the money, but because the plots were just slimy." Nelson Carro's El cine de luchadores echoed a sentiment similar to Aviña's, stating that the series would "end up totally degenerating" in this film. The magazine Dosfilos described the film series stating that after the character's first appearance in its namesake film, "there would be other less fortunate, although funny ones, such as El misterio de Huracán Ramírez, and the frankly horrendous and forgettable ones, like Huracán Ramírez y la monjita negra."  In El cine que el viento se llevó, Miguel Carrara singled out Titina Romay's performance and the fact that she wore blackface to play the title role of the "black nun", sarcastically describing the film as the one "in which Titina Romay remembered that she was the chocolate girl in Angelitos negros", referencing that Romay also wore blackface in that film, where she portrayed a dark-skinned child. David E. Wilt in The Mexican Film Bulletin was more benevolent, however, saying, "Huracán Ramírez y la monjita negra isn't a bad film, and—to be fair—was advertised as a comedy rather than a lucha action picture. The acting is broad but within acceptable limits, and the production values are satisfactory."

References

External links

1973 films
1970s Spanish-language films
Mexican sports films
Lucha libre films
Films directed by Joselito Rodríguez
1970s Mexican films